is a former Japanese tarento, actress and fashion model.

Sato is formerly represented with Horipro. She won the Horipro Talent Scout Caravan Grand Prix. Sato is the second generation J.League female manager. She was an exclusive model for the magazine non-no. Sato is nicknamed .

Filmography

Television

Advertisements

Internet

TV dramas

Films

Stage

Others

Bibliography

Magazine serialisations

Magazines

Internet serializations

References

Notes

Sources

External links
 
non-no Models Profile Miki Sato - non-no 
Miki Sato no My Page - non-no 
: J.League.jp 

Japanese female models
Japanese gravure models
Japanese television personalities
21st-century Japanese actresses
Horipro artists
Models from Tochigi Prefecture
1993 births
Living people